Grant Island is a bird sanctuary in Okanagan Lake, British Columbia, Canada. Grant Island is located in the northern half of Okanagan Lake, about one kilometre from the shores of the municipality of Lake Country (Winfield-Oyama). Grant Island is one of only two islands in Okanagan Lake, the other being Rattlesnake Island.

Gallery

References 

Regional District of Central Okanagan
Lake islands of British Columbia
Tourist attractions in the Okanagan
Uninhabited islands of British Columbia